Manfred Linzmaier (born 27 August 1962 in Kufstein) is a retired Austrian footballer. He is now a football manager.

Club career
Nicknamed Tyroler Keegan, Linzmaier started his professional career at FC Wacker Innsbruck, later renamed FC Swarovski Tirol, and stayed for 12 years playing alongside German midfield maestro Hansi Müller. He moved to Second Division LASK Linz to clinch promotion to the Austrian Football Bundesliga. He then had a short spell at Vorwärts Steyr before winning the 2nd division title again with FC Linz. He finished his career at hometown club FC Kufstein.

After his playing career, he became assistant to head-coach Kurt Jara at FC Tirol, Hamburger SV and 1. FC Kaiserslautern.

International career
He made his debut for Austria in 1985 and was a participant at the 1990 FIFA World Cup. He earned 25 caps, scoring 2 goals. His last international was a May 1991 friendly match against Sweden.

International goals
Scores and results list Austria's goal tally first.

Honours
Austrian Football Bundesliga (2):
 1989, 1990
Austrian Cup (2):
 1989, 1993

External links
 LASK stats - LASK
 
 Interview with Linzmaier - Wacker Innsbruck

References

1962 births
Living people
People from Kufstein
Austrian footballers
Austria international footballers
1990 FIFA World Cup players
FC Wacker Innsbruck players
LASK players
SK Vorwärts Steyr players
Austrian Football Bundesliga players
Austrian football managers
FC Red Bull Salzburg managers
Association football midfielders
Footballers from Tyrol (state)
20th-century Austrian people
FC Swarovski Tirol players